Cypripedium parviflorum, commonly known as yellow lady's slipper or moccasin flower, is a lady's slipper orchid native to North America. It is widespread, ranging from Alaska south to Arizona and Georgia. It grows in fens, wetlands, shorelines, and damp woodlands.

Taxonomy
C. parviflorum is a highly variable species, which is a result of both hybridization and phenotypic plasticity.

Four varieties are widely recognized. They are:

C. parviflorum var. exiliens Sheviak – Alaska
C. parviflorum var. makasin (Farwell) Sheviak – commonly called the "northern yellow lady's-slipper"; widely distributed over much of Canada and the northern United States
C. parviflorum var. parviflorum – commonly called the "small yellow lady's-slipper"; southern part of the species range, from eastern Nebraska and eastern Oklahoma east to Virginia and New Hampshire
C. parviflorum var. pubescens (Willdenow) O. W. Knight – commonly called the "large yellow lady's-slipper"; very widespread across much of United States, Canada, and St. Pierre & Miquelon; treated by many authors as a distinct species, Cypripedium pubescens

References

External links 
 
 

parviflorum
Orchids of Canada
Orchids of the United States
Orchids of California
Orchids of Kentucky
Orchids of Maryland
Flora of the Eastern United States
Flora of the Western United States
Flora of Alaska
Flora of the Appalachian Mountains
Flora of the Rocky Mountains
Flora of Saint Pierre and Miquelon
Flora of the Sierra Nevada (United States)
Plants described in 1791
Taxa named by Richard Anthony Salisbury
Flora without expected TNC conservation status